Marsha Feinland was a third-party candidate (Peace and Freedom Party) for President of the United States in the 1996 U.S. presidential election.  Her running mate was Kate McClatchy; they were only on the ballot in California and received 25,332 votes. The Peace and Freedom Party convention had actually voted to run a slate of candidates for the United States Electoral College divided proportionally between the three top candidates for president at the convention, since none had received a majority. The California Secretary of State's office refused to place the names of electors on the ballot and demanded that the party put forward a single name (even though U.S. citizens do not vote directly for president). Marsha Feinland was selected by the officers of the party to represent it in the election and Kate McClatchy of Massachusetts agreed to serve as the vice-presidential candidate.

Feinland had served as state party chair for the Peace and Freedom Party from 1994–96, 1998–2000, 2002–04, and has frequently been a candidate for public office.  In June 1998, she ran for governor but lost the Peace & Freedom party primary to Gloria La Riva.  In September 1998, she ran for the California State Senate against Democratic candidate Don Perata in a special election.  This was part of the special election musical chairs of 1998–99.  In the 2004 election, Feinland ran for the United States Senate against Barbara Boxer, and received 233,000 votes.

She ran again for U.S. Senator from California in 2006, receiving 117,764 votes, 1.3% of the total.

She was previously elected to Berkeley's Rent Stabilization Board, and served from 1994 to 1998.

References

Year of birth missing (living people)
Living people
Female candidates for President of the United States
Peace and Freedom Party presidential nominees
Candidates in the 1996 United States presidential election
20th-century American politicians
Women in California politics
20th-century American women politicians
21st-century American women